Diana Glenn (born 1974) is an Australian actress with many credits in television, film, and theatre.

Early life and education
Glenn has an English father, Greek mother and three siblings. She attended Melbourne Girls Grammar School and studied arts at Monash University and Melbourne University.

Career

Glenn is best known for her lead/prominent roles in television series including Satisfaction (2007–2009), Canal Road (2008), in the title role of Carla Cametti PD (2009), The Secret Life of Us as Jemima (2005), Neighbours in 1998 as Shannon Jones, Outriders (2001), The Elephant Princess (2008), Home and Away (2010) as Britt Hobart, and The Slap (2011) as Sandi. She has also had significant roles in Secrets and Lies (2013) and Underbelly: Squizzy (2013).

Her movie roles include Oyster Farmer (2004), Somersault (2004), and Black Water (2007).

Personal life
Glenn was in a relationship with her Carla Cametti PD co-star Vince Colosimo. In April 2014, Glenn gave birth to their son, Massimo Colosimo. The couple separated two months after the birth of their child in 2014. Glenn has lived in Paris, France, and speaks French.

Filmography

Film

Television

References

External links

1974 births
Living people
20th-century Australian actresses
21st-century Australian actresses
AACTA Award winners
Australian people of Greek descent
Australian film actresses
Australian people of English descent
Australian soap opera actresses
Australian stage actresses
Monash University alumni
People educated at Melbourne Girls Grammar